The Minister of Justice of Hungary is a member of the Hungarian cabinet and the head of the Ministry of Justice. The current justice minister is Judit Varga.

The position was called People's Commissar of Justice during the Hungarian Soviet Republic in 1919, Minister of Justice and Law Enforcement from 2006 to 2010 and Minister of Public Administration and Justice between 2010 and 2014.

This page is a list of Ministers of Justice of Hungary.

Ministers of Justice (1848–1919)

Hungarian Kingdom (1848–1849)
Parties

Hungarian State (1849)
Parties

After the collapse of the Hungarian Revolution of 1848, the Hungarian Kingdom became an integral part of the Austrian Empire until 1867, when dual Austro-Hungarian Monarchy was created.

Hungarian Kingdom (1867–1918)
Parties

Hungarian People's Republic (1918–1919)
Parties

People's Commissars of Justice (1919)

Hungarian Soviet Republic (1919)
Parties

Counter-revolutionary governments (1919)
Parties

Ministers of Justice (1919–2006)

Hungarian People's Republic (1919)
Parties

Hungarian Republic (1919–1920)
Parties

Hungarian Kingdom (1920–1946)
Parties

Government of National Unity (1944–1945)
Parties

Soviet-backed provisional governments (1944–1946)
Parties

Hungarian Republic (1946–1949)
Parties

Hungarian People's Republic (1949–1989)
Parties

Hungarian Republic (1989–2006)
Parties

Ministers of Justice and Law Enforcement (2006–2010)

Hungarian Republic (2006–2010)
Parties

Ministers of Public Administration and Justice (2010–2014)

Hungarian Republic / Hungary (2010–2014)
Parties

Ministers of Justice (2014–present)

Hungary (2014–present)
Parties

See also
List of heads of state of Hungary
List of prime ministers of Hungary
List of Ministers of Agriculture of Hungary
List of Ministers of Civilian Intelligence Services of Hungary
List of Ministers of Croatian Affairs of Hungary
List of Ministers of Defence of Hungary
List of Ministers of Education of Hungary
List of Ministers of Finance of Hungary
List of Ministers of Foreign Affairs of Hungary
List of Ministers of Interior of Hungary
List of Ministers of Public Works and Transport of Hungary
Politics of Hungary

Justice Ministers